Ally Seifried is an American politician who is the Oklahoma Senate member from the 2nd district. She is a member of the Cherokee Nation.

Early life and education
Ally Seifried is a ninth-generation Oklahoman and member of the Cherokee Nation. She was homeschooled before attending Claremore Christian School for high school.
Seifried later attended college at Rogers State University where she was on the basketball team. She graduated with her bachelor's degree in political science in 2015.

Career
After graduating college, she worked as an executive assistant to Oklahoma State Senator Dan Newberry from 2016 to 2017. Seifried works for Müllerhaus Legacy, a Tulsa publishing company.

Oklahoma Senate
Ally Seifried ran for the Oklahoma Senate in 2022 for retiring Senator Marty Quinn's 2nd district seat. She faced three other candidates in the Republican primary: Keith Austin, Jarrin Jackson, and Coy Jenkins. Seifried advanced to a runoff against Jarrin Jackson, who had gained national attention during the campaign for his social media presence which the Tulsa World described as "anti-Semitic, homophobic and conspiracy-laced." Seifried defeated Jarrin Jackson in the August Republican runoff election. She won the November general election, defeating Democratic candidate Jennifer Esau and assumed office on November 16, 2022.

References

21st-century American politicians
21st-century American women politicians
Living people
Cherokee Nation state legislators in Oklahoma
Republican Party Oklahoma state senators
Women state legislators in Oklahoma
Year of birth missing (living people)